Acorna's Quest (1998) is a science fantasy  novel by American writers  Anne McCaffrey and Margaret Ball. It is the sequel to their Acorna: The Unicorn Girl; those two were the first books in the Acorna Universe series. McCaffrey and Elizabeth Ann Scarborough continued the series beginning with Acorna's People (1999).

Plot synopsis 

Found as an infant drifting in space, Acorna, the Unicorn Girl, has become a young woman. She still has her tiny, translucent horn and her "funny" feet and hands. And she still has her miraculous ability to make plants grow and heal human sickness.
But Acorna has strange dreams of a gentle folk who mind-speak by touching horns. With her "Uncle" Calum, one of the three grizzled asteroid prospectors who rescued, protected, and raised her, she sets off to find her people. No sooner does she leave than a mysterious craft appears, piloted by the Linyaari, a gentle race with telepathic powers.
The Linyaari are roaming the galaxy, spreading the alarm about the deadly Khleev- and searching for a beloved little girl they had given up for lost, long ago...

References

1998 American novels
1998 fantasy novels
1998 science fiction novels
Novels by Anne McCaffrey
Acorna
Eos Books books